Sniatynka is a village (selo) in Drohobych Raion, Lviv Oblast, in south-west Ukraine. It belongs to Drohobych urban hromada, one of the hromadas of Ukraine.

The village was first mentioned in the middle of the 14th century.

References 

Villages in Drohobych Raion